Mikkelin Pallo-Kissat (or MiPK) is a Finnish football club, based in Mikkeli.

Background
MiPK was founded in 1946, after footballers from local sports club Vauhti, wanted their own club specialized in ball games. MiPK is a member of Finnish Workers' Sports Federation. In early 1980s club was driven into financial difficulties and their final season was in 1983, new club called Mikkelin Kissat was formed to continue clubs operations. MiPK was able to avoid bankruptcy and in 1997 they re-joined Finnish FA. Since 2016 Mikkelin Kissat has used Mikkelin Pallo-Kissat as their men's name as a homage to original MiPK. In 2020 Mikkelin Kissat continued as a Mikkelin Pallo-Kissat. MiPK shares a local rivalry with MP, in the past MiPK was considered as a working class club while MP was more middle class.

Season to season

References

External links
Official website
Finnish Wikipedia

Football clubs in Finland
Mikkeli
Association football clubs established in 1946
1946 establishments in Finland